The International Soccer League Association New Orleans (ISLANO) is a men's amateur soccer league in New Orleans, LA.

2013 champions, Motagua New Orleans, represented the LSA and ISLANO in the 2013 USASA Region III National Cup.

Notable players and coaches

This list of notable players and coaches comprises players who have played professionally or internationally, whether before or after their tenure in ISLANO.

 Eduardo Laing
 Steven Morris
 Anthony Peters
 Víctor Ortiz
 Samir Arzú
 Donaldo Morales
 Jaime Rosales
 Hendry Cordova

References

Soccer in New Orleans
Soccer leagues in the United States
Regional Soccer leagues in the United States